Anne-Mie Van Kerckhoven (born 5 December, 1951) is a Belgian artist whose work involves painting, drawing, computer art and video art.

Biography
Anne-Mie Van Kerckhoven (also known as AMVK) was born in Antwerp and lives in Antwerp and Berlin. In 1981 she founded the noise band Club Moral with Danny Devos. Since 1982 she has been represented by Zeno X Gallery in Antwerp, Belgium, and since 1999 by Galerie Barbara Thumm in Berlin. In 2003 she was awarded the Flanders' Prize for Visual Arts.

In 2005 the HeadNurse-files was published. By means of installation shots, film stills and artistic images, this book presents an overview of the projects' development from 1995 to 2004 and possibly beyond. In 2006 she was awarded a DAAD stipendium to spend one year in Berlin.
In 2022 she will receive an honorary doctor degree from the University of Antwerp.

Life and work
Anne-Mie Van Kerckhoven has been fascinated for a long time with the representation in the mass media of images of women, of interiors, of the kinetic powers of any kind of language. She investigates supra-moral connections in contemporary society between sex and technology. Her work connects different knowledge systems, explores the areas of the unconscious, and looks at moral aberrations or the obscene from a female point of view.

Since 2005 she has been working on a conceptual and pictorial trialogue between the mystic Marguerite Porete, the hermetic Giordano Bruno and the philosopher Herbert Marcuse.

Selected exhibitions

Solo 
 Anne-Mie Van Kerckhoven, Zeno X Gallery Antwerp, 1995
 Morele Herbewapening / Moral Rearmament, Kunsthalle Lophem 1996
 HeadNurse, Zeno X Gallery Antwerp, 1998
 Nursing care, in melancholy stupor, MuHKA Antwerp, 1999
 Prober5, Galerie Barbara Thumm Berlin, 2000
 In Dreams,  Galerie Barbara Thumm 2003
 Deeper, Kunsthalle Lophem 2003
 AntiSade, Zeno X Gallery Antwerpen, 2003
 How reliable is the brain?, Aachen, 2004
 AMVK – EZFK: Europaisches Zentrum für Futuristische Kunst (Kunsthalle Bern) 2005.
 Veerkracht thuis!, Objectif exhibitions Antwerp, 2006
 Oh, the Sick Lady / Ah, the Sick Lady (Explodes from Within), Galerie Barbara Thumm Berlin, 2007
 Über das ICH (Willkür und Transzendenz) and a lot of fun (daadgalerie Berlin) 2007
 Nothing More Natural, Kunstmuseum Luzern Lucerne, 2008
 Nothing More Natural, Wiels Center for Contemporary Art, Brussels, 2008
 Nothing More Natural, Kunsthalle Nürnberg Nuremberg 2009
 On Mars the Rising Sun is Blue, Zeno X Gallery Antwerp, 2009
 In a Saturnian World, Renaissance Society Chicago 2011
 Mistress of the Horizon, Mu.ZEE Ostend, 2012
 3 Carrels (Degenerate Customized Solutions), Zeno X Gallery Antwerp, 2014
 Serving Compressed Energy with Vacuum, Kunstverein München München, 2015
 AMVK, MuHKA, Antwerp 2018
 AMVK, Kassel, 2018

Group 
 Woord en Beeld,  MuHKA Antwerp, 1992
 Trouble spot.painting (MuHKA/NICC) Antwerp 1999
 Die Verletzte Diva, Galerie im Taxispalais Berlin, 2000
 Dream Extensions Ghent 2004
 Dear ICC, MuHKA Antwerp, 2004
 Collectiepresentatie XI, MuHKA Antwerp
 Extremities. Flemish art in Vladivostok, Museum Artetage, Vladivostok, 2006
 Collectiepresentatie XVI: Attributen en Substantie, MuHKA Antwerp, 2006
 I Walk the Lines, Galerie Barbara Thumm Berlin, 2006
 Manifesta 7 / "THE SOUL (or, Much Trouble in the Transportation of Souls)", Manifesta 7 Trento, 2006

Notes

References

External links

MuHKA
Kunstaspekte
Chapter of Opening the Mouth of Time - a daily AMVK blog

1951 births
Living people
Belgian painters
People from Antwerp
Artists from Antwerp
Writers from Antwerp
Belgian women painters
20th-century Belgian women artists
21st-century Belgian women artists
Royal Academy of Fine Arts (Antwerp) alumni
Members of the Royal Flemish Academy of Belgium for Science and the Arts